Petrophytum cinerascens (orth. var. Petrophyton cinerascens) is a rare species of flowering plant in the rose family known by the common names halfshrub rockmat and Chelan rockmat. It is endemic to the state of Washington in the United States, where it occurs in just a few locations along the Columbia River in Chelan and Douglas Counties.

Description
Petrophytum cinerascens is a mat-forming perennial herb growing in cracks and crevices in riverside cliffs. Blooming occurs in June through September.

Conservation
There are five occurrences of this plant all in a 27-kilometer stretch of cliffs along the Columbia River in central Washington. Two of the occurrences have about 1000 individuals each; the other three have fewer.

The plant is threatened by quarrying of rock nearby. Other threats include highway maintenance, introduced species of plants such as cheat grass (Bromus tectorum), herbicides, rock climbing, motor vehicle emissions, and global warming.

References

cinerascens
Flora of Washington (state)